The RWD-10 was a Polish aerobatics sports plane, single-seat parasol wing monoplane, used from 1933 to 1939 and constructed by the RWD team.

Development
The aircraft was designed as a single-seater aerobatic sports plane that could also be used as a trainer for fighter pilots. Its chief designer was Jerzy Drzewiecki of the RWD design team at the DWL (Doświadczalne Warsztaty Lotnicze) aircraft factory. Its silhouette was similar to the RWD-8. The first prototype (registration SP-ALC), was flown in July 1933 by Drzewiecki. Its stability was not satisfactory, but after modifications, including lengthening of the fuselage, it turned out to be a successful design, completing state trials in 1935. In a mock dogfight with the PZL P.11c fighter, the RWD-10 kept on the P.11's tail. The first public aerobatics show of the RWD-10 took place during the Gordon Bennett Cup in ballooning on September 14–15, 1935 in Warsaw.

In 1936, the LOPP paramilitary organization ordered 20 aircraft, the purchase funded by a public collection for aviation development. They were built in 1937 and then distributed among the Polish regional aero clubs - the largest number going to the Warsaw Aero Club. In 1938, another two were built. In total, approximately 22 serial RWD-10s were produced.

Three aircraft crashed before the war, the rest were probably destroyed during the Invasion of Poland in 1939.

Description
Mixed construction single-engine single-seat braced high-wing (parasol wing) monoplane, conventional in layout. Fuselage of a steel frame, covered with canvas on a wooden frame, in aluminum in engine section. Straight double-trapezoid two-part wing, of wooden construction, covered with canvas and plywood in front, two-spar. The wing was supported by a central pyramid and twin struts. Wooden construction cantilever empennage, covered with plywood (stabilizers) and canvas (rudder and elevators). A pilot in an open cockpit, had a windshield.  Conventional fixed landing gear, with a rear skid. Four-cylinder air-cooled inverted straight engine PZInż. Junior (licence built Walter Junior) with 82 kW (110 hp) nominal power and 90 kW (120 hp) take-off power. Two-blade wooden propeller Szomański, of a fixed pitch. Fuel tank in the fuselage: 54 L (fuel consumption 25 L/h).

Specifications (RWD-10)

See also

References

Further reading

External links

Photos and drawings at Ugolok Neba site

1930s Polish sport aircraft
RWD-10
Aerobatic aircraft
Parasol-wing aircraft
Single-engined tractor aircraft
Aircraft first flown in 1933